Qeynarjeh (also Romanized as Qaynarjeh and Qeynarjah; also known as Ghaynarjeh, Gheynarjeh, and Kanīr Jatr) is a village in Boghrati Rural District, Sardrud District, Razan County, Hamadan Province, Iran. At the 2006 census, its population was 2,233, in 582 families.

References 

Populated places in Razan County